The 1990 NCAA Division I Tennis Championships were the 44th annual championships to determine the national champions of NCAA Division I men's singles, doubles, and team collegiate tennis in the United States.

For the third consecutive year, Stanford claimed the men's team national title, the Cardinal's eleventh overall.

Host sites
The men's tournaments were played in Los Angeles, California, hosted by the University of Southern California. The men's and women's tournaments would not be held at the same site until 2006.

Team championship

See also
1990 NCAA Division I Women's Tennis Championships
NCAA Division II Tennis Championships (Men, Women)
NCAA Division III Tennis Championships (Men, Women)
NAIA Men's Tennis Championship

References

External links
List of NCAA Men's Tennis Champions

NCAA Division I tennis championships
NCAA Division I Men's Tennis Championships
NCAA Division I Men's Tennis Championships
NCAA Division I Men's Tennis Championships
Tennis in California